The Institute for the Supervision of Insurance (in Italian Istituto per la vigilanza sulle assicurazioni also known as IVASS) is the Italian insurance supervisory authority, an independent authority responsible for supervising and regulating all insurance business in Italy. Effective January 1, 2013, the former insurance authority, ISVAP, transferred all its assets and responsibilities to the Italian Insurance Supervisory Authority, which had a new governance, integrated with that of Banca d'Italia. 

The President of IVASS is the Senior Deputy Governor of the Banca d'Italia, Fabio Panetta.

See also

Lamfalussy process
European Commissioner for Internal Market and Services
European System of Financial Supervisors
European Banking Authority
European Securities and Markets Authority
European Systemic Risk Board

Notes

External links
 Official IVASS−Italian Insurance Supervisory Authority website

Regulation in Italy
Insurance industry organizations
Insurance
Insurance
Financial regulatory authorities of Italy
Insurance supervisory authorities